Saadat Pur (Urdu: ﺳﻌﺎﺩﺖ ﭘﻮﺮ) (pop. 1,000) is the major village of the Tehsil Sarai Alamgir. It is part of Gujrat district in the north of Punjab province. The village is located on the eastern bank of the Upper Jhelum Canal and is located on road connecting Sarai Alamgir and Mirpur.

Geography and climate 
Saadat Pur is located at  (32.900000, 73.750000) and lies at an altitude of 248 metres (818 ft) above sea-level.

The Village as a whole has a moderate climate. In summer, temperatures can reach 45 °C, but the hot spells are comparatively short. The winter months are very pleasant with temperatures rarely falling below 2 °C.

History 
The ancient history of the region has seen it participate in the Indus Valley civilization and the Gandhara Civilization. At a later date, the Battle of the Hydaspes took place nearby, between the armies of Alexander the Great and the Indian king Porus.

The actual Village of Saadat Pur was founded by the Saadat Khan who migrated to this place and inhabited the area. This place was chosen because of its ideal location on the Upper jhelum canal and the road connecting Sarai Alamgir and Mirpur providing easy access to main markets.

Saadat Pur gained its prominence when the Upper Jhelum canal was created from Jhelum river; Saadat Pur village was provided with bridge that linked villages situated on either sides of new canal. Hence enabling other close by villages to use the route. The village became hub of activities i.e. establishment of Saadat Pur Market (commonly known as PUL), Saadat Pur Post Office, branches of two leading commercial banks and a High School for boys.

Castes living in Saadat Pur 
Main caste of the village is Gujar. The history of different castes started when Saadat Khan a Gujar by caste ( and Khatana by sub caste) along with his family came to the region and started using land for agriculture. Newly settled family was threatened by Jats of a nearby village. To establish a strong community and Gujar dominance in region Saadat Khan invited another Gujar caste Phambare from nearby region giving 50% of the land. Latter Saadat khan invited third Gujar caste Chauhan and offered then 50% of his remaining land.

Apart from Gujar caste, different artisan castes were also allowed to live in village and provide services to Gujar clan. these included Masali for doing labor work, Nayee for Hair cutting and food making, Kasbi for making cloths, Kumhaar for making food utensils, Mauchi for making shoes.

Transport 

A good two lane road connects village to Sarai Alamgir from where passengers can use railway station and the Grand Trunk Road. Also same road leads to Mirpur in opposite direction providing connections to different cities of Azad Kashmir

Sites of interest 
The town Lies between the ancient town of Sarai Alamgir and the Mirpur. Nearby are the sites of the Jagu Head, Mangla Dam, River Jhelum, and the huge Rohtas Fort.

Populated places in Gujrat District